Coranarta is a genus of moths of the family Noctuidae.

Species
 Coranarta carbonaria (Christoph, 1893)
 Coranarta cordigera (Thunberg, 1792)
 Coranarta luteola (Grote & Robinson, 1865)
 Coranarta macrostigma (Lafontaine & Mikkola, 1987)
 Coranarta restricta Yela, 2002

References
Natural History Museum Lepidoptera genus database
Coranarta at funet

Hadenini